In Canada, a number of monuments have been erected to honour royal individuals, whether a member of the past French royal family, British royal family, or present Canadian royal family, thus reflecting the country's status as a constitutional monarchy under the Canadian Crown.

Alberta

British Columbia

Manitoba

The statue of Queen Victoria at the Manitoba Legislative Building and the statue of Queen Elizabeth II at Government House were torn down by a mob on July 1, 2021, in a protest about residential schools. The statue is scheduled to be repaired.

New Brunswick

Ontario

Quebec

Saskatchewan

See also
 Royal eponyms in Canada
 List of National Historic Sites of Canada

References